Le bambole (U.S. title: The Dolls, UK title: Four Kinds of Love) is a 1965 Italian comedy film in four segments; starring Nino Manfredi, Virna Lisi, Elke Sommer, and Mario Montuori.

The four vignettes—The Telephone Call (La telefonata), Treatise on Eugenics (Il trattato di eugenetica), The Soup (La minestra), and Monsignor Cupid (Monsignor Cupido)—concern secrets of love and secret lovers. The fourth segment is based on a tale of Boccaccio's The Decameron.

Plot
This semi-amusing sex (romance) comedy has four separate stories.

Cast
 Nino Manfredi as Giorgio (segment "La telefornata")
 Virna Lisi as Luisa (segment "La telefornata")
 Elke Sommer as Ulla (segment "Il trattato di eugenetica")
 Maurizio Arena as Massimo (segment "Il trattato di eugenetica)
 Piero Focaccia as Valerio (segment "Il trattato di eugenetica)
 Monica Vitti as Giovanna (segment "La minestra")
 Gina Lollobrigida as Beatrice (segment "Monsignor Cupido")
 Jean Sorel as Vincenzo (segment "Monsignor Cupido")
 Akim Tamiroff as Monsignor Arcudi (segment "Monsignor Cupido")

Notes

External links

 

1965 films
1960s Italian-language films
Commedia all'italiana
Italian anthology films
Films set in Rome
Films directed by Dino Risi
Films directed by Mauro Bolognini
Films directed by Luigi Comencini
Films directed by Franco Rossi
1965 comedy films
1960s Italian films